Chung Chien-peng is a political scientist from Hong Kong.

Chung graduated from the University of Calgary with a bachelor's degree in economics, and completed a master's in the subject at University of Toronto. He then pursued graduate study in political science at the University of Southern California, where he earned a second master's degree and doctorate. He is a professor at Lingnan University.

Selected publications
Alternative URL

 Alternative URL

References

Living people
Year of birth missing (living people)
Hong Kong political scientists
Academic staff of Lingnan University
University of Southern California alumni
University of Toronto alumni
University of Calgary alumni
Hong Kong expatriates in Canada
Hong Kong expatriates in the United States